Aristotelia avanica is a moth of the family Gelechiidae. It was described by Piskunov and Emelyanov in 1982. It is found in Armenia and Uzbekistan.

The larvae feed on Atraphaxis spinosa.

References

Moths described in 1982
Aristotelia (moth)
Moths of Asia